Corindi River, an open mature wave dominated barrier estuary, is located in the Northern Rivers region of New South Wales, Australia.

Course and features
Corindi River rises below Knobbys Lookout, in hilly country located to the west of Woolgoolga, and flows generally north northeast, north northwest, east northeast, and northeast, before reaching its mouth with the Coral Sea of the South Pacific Ocean north of Red Rock; descending  over its  course.

The river is transversed by the Pacific Highway near Corindi Beach.

See also

 Rivers of New South Wales
 Rivers in Australia

References

 

Rivers of New South Wales
Northern Rivers